South of Rio is a 1949 American Western film directed by Philip Ford, written by Norman S. Hall, and starring Monte Hale, Kay Christopher, Paul Hurst, Roy Barcroft, Douglas Kennedy and Don Haggerty. It was released on July 27, 1949, by Republic Pictures.

Plot

Cast    
Monte Hale as Jeff Lanning
Kay Christopher as Carol Waterman
Paul Hurst as Andy Weems
Roy Barcroft as Lon Bryson
Douglas Kennedy as Henchman Bob Mitchell
Don Haggerty as Chuck Bowers
Rory Mallinson as Captain Dan Brennan
Lane Bradford as Henchman Tex
Emmett Vogan as Henry Waterman
Myron Healey as Marshal Travis
Tom London as Jim Weston

References

External links 
 

1949 films
American Western (genre) films
1949 Western (genre) films
Republic Pictures films
Films directed by Philip Ford
American black-and-white films
1940s English-language films
1940s American films